
Year 807 (DCCCVII) was a common year starting on Friday (link will display the full calendar) of the Julian calendar.

Events 
 By place 

 Abbasid Empire and Byzantine Empire 
 Emperor Nikephoros I is forced to sue for peace, on condition of paying 50,000 nomismata to Caliph Harun al-Rashid, and agrees to a yearly tribute. Nikephoros promises not to rebuild the dismantled forts. Rashid recalls his forces from various sieges, and evacuates Byzantine territory.

 An Abbasid fleet under Humayd ibn Ma'yuf al-Hajuri raids the Peloponnese, Rhodes and Myra.

 Europe 
 Al-Andalus (modern Spain): An uprising occurs in the city of Mérida against the Umayyad Emirate of Córdoba.
 Siege of Patras: This marks the end of independent rule by the South Slavs in the Peloponnese (or 805).

 Britain 
 The Vikings land on the Cornish coast, and form an alliance with the Cornish to fight against Wessex.
 King Cuthred of Kent dies. His brother, King Coenwulf of Mercia, takes control over Kent himself.

 Asia 
 Dappula II becomes king of Sri Lanka, and makes Anuradhapura the capital city.
 Li Jifu is appointed chancellor, during the reign of Emperor Xian Zong in China.

 By topic 

 Religion 
 The Temple of Motoyama-ji in Mitoyo (Japan), of the Kōyasan Shingon-shū sect, is constructed by the orders of Emperor Heizei.
 The Jame' Atiq Mosque of Qazvin is constructed in Qazvin (modern Iran), by the orders of Harun al-Rashid.
 The Book of Armagh is written by the Irish illuminator Ferdomnach, a scribe at the School of Armagh.

 Science 
 The first record of sun spots appears in Europe.

Births 
 Dongshan Liangjie, Chinese Buddhist teacher (d. 869)

Deaths 
 October 13 – Simpert, bishop of Augsburg
 Conall mac Taidg, king of the Picts (approximate date)
 Cuthred, king of Kent
 Robert II, Frankish nobleman (approximate date)
 Stephen the Hymnographer, Syrian monk (b. 725)
 Widukind, duke of Saxony (approximate date)

References

Sources